K-Electric Football Club, commonly referred to as K-Electric F.C., or simply known as KE, was a Pakistani football club located in Karachi, Sindh, that played in the Pakistan Premier League. The club's home stadium is Peoples Football Stadium and was affiliated with K-Electric. K-Electric, along with Karachi Port Trust and Karachi United was among the major football clubs from Karachi.

Founded in 1913, K-Electric won promotion in 2005 from the Pakistan Football Federation League when they finished runners-up to Pakistan Railways. The club won their first league title in 2014–15 season, previously finishing as runners-up in the past two seasons, becoming the first club from Pakistan to have qualified for AFC Cup.

The club colors, reflected in their crest and kit, are back and yellow.

In August 2015, K-Electric F.C. made Pakistan football history by becoming the first Pakistan football club to progress into the AFC Cup play-offs after overcoming the champions of Bhutan and Mongolia. They drew 3–3 with Druk United before beating Khoromkhon 1–0. However, in the play-offs, they lost 2–0 to Al-Hidd.

In October that same year, K-Electric F.C. competed in the Sheikh Kamal International Club Cup. Their striker Muhammad Rasool scored 4 goals in 3 games.

K-Electric also organised various youth initiatives such as the K-Electric Lyari U16 Football League.

In 2020, K-Electric decided to disband their team.

Rivalry
The club had a long-standing rivalry with Rawalpindi-based Khan Research Laboratories. The rivalry started when K-Electric and Khan Research Laboratories faced off in two back-to-back Pakistan National Challenge Cup finals, in 2011 and 2012, with Khan Research Laboratories winning both the finals 1–0 and 3–1 on penalties with game drawn 0–0 after extra time respectively. Although it was K-Electric, that ended the reign of Khan Research Laboratories as domestic champions when they won the league in 2014-15 season.

Honours

Winners
Pakistan Premier League: (1)
2014–15

Runner up
Pakistan Premier League: (2)
2012–13, 2013–14

Pakistan National Football Challenge Cup:(4)
2011, 2012, 2013, 2014

Continental history

References

 
1913 establishments in the British Empire
Association football clubs established in 1913
Works association football clubs in Pakistan
Football in Karachi